The R. Farnum House is an historic house located at 22 Oak Street, in Uxbridge, Massachusetts.  This  story wood-frame house was built c. 1875–80, and is a well-preserved local example of Gothic Revival styling.  It has an elaborately decorated front porch, and bargeboard decoration and a pierced apron in the main gable end.  The gable details are repeated in gable ends on the north side of the house.  Nothing is known about R. Farnum, who was probably from the locally numerous Farnums who settled the area in the 18th century.

On October 7, 1983, it was added to the National Register of Historic Places.

See also
National Register of Historic Places listings in Uxbridge, Massachusetts

References

External links
 R. Farnum House MACRIS Listing

Houses in Uxbridge, Massachusetts
National Register of Historic Places in Uxbridge, Massachusetts
Houses on the National Register of Historic Places in Worcester County, Massachusetts
Gothic Revival architecture in Massachusetts